Paulo Cesar Elias, better known as Paulinho, (born 15 October 1984 in Guaranésia) is a Brazilian football player who plays as a left back. He plays for Novorizontino.

Career statistics

(Correct )

Contract
 Atlético Paranaense

References

External links
 
 

1984 births
Living people
Brazilian footballers
Luverdense Esporte Clube players
Esporte Clube Novo Hamburgo players
Club Athletico Paranaense players
Atlético Clube Goianiense players
Avaí FC players
Paraná Clube players
Grêmio Novorizontino players
Clube de Regatas Brasil players
Cuiabá Esporte Clube players
Campeonato Brasileiro Série A players
Campeonato Brasileiro Série B players
Campeonato Brasileiro Série C players
Campeonato Brasileiro Série D players
Association football defenders